In numerical mathematics, the gradient discretisation method (GDM) is a framework which contains classical and recent numerical schemes for diffusion problems of various kinds: linear or non-linear, steady-state or time-dependent.  The schemes may be conforming or non-conforming, and may rely on very general polygonal or polyhedral meshes (or may even be meshless).

Some core properties are required to prove the convergence of a GDM. These core properties enable complete proofs of convergence of the GDM for elliptic and parabolic problems, linear or non-linear. For non-linear problems, the proofs are based on compactness techniques and do not require any non-physical strong regularity assumption on the solution or the model data. Non-linear models for which such convergence proof of the GDM have been carried out comprise: the Stefan problem which is modelling a melting material, two-phase flows in porous media, the Richards equation of underground water flow, the fully non-linear Leray—Lions equations.

Any scheme entering the GDM framework is then known to converge on all these problems. This applies in particular to conforming Finite Elements, Mixed Finite Elements, nonconforming Finite Elements, and, in the case of more recent schemes, the Discontinuous Galerkin method, Hybrid Mixed Mimetic method, the Nodal Mimetic Finite Difference method, some Discrete Duality Finite Volume schemes, and some Multi-Point Flux Approximation schemes

The example of a linear diffusion problem

Consider Poisson's equation in a bounded open domain , with homogeneous Dirichlet boundary condition

where . The usual sense of weak solution  to this model is:

In a nutshell, the GDM for such a model consists in selecting a finite-dimensional space and two reconstruction operators (one for the functions, one for the gradients) and to substitute these discrete elements in lieu of the continuous elements in (2). More precisely, the GDM starts by defining a Gradient Discretization (GD), which is a triplet , where:

 the set of discrete unknowns  is a finite dimensional real vector space,

The related Gradient Scheme for the approximation of (2) is given by: find  such that

The GDM is then in this case a nonconforming method for the approximation of (2), which includes the nonconforming finite element method. Note that the reciprocal is not true, in the sense that the GDM framework includes methods such that the function  cannot be computed from the function .

The following error estimate, inspired by G. Strang's second lemma, holds

and

defining:

which measures the coercivity (discrete Poincaré constant),

which measures the interpolation error,

which measures the defect of conformity.

Note that the following upper and lower bounds of the approximation error can be derived:

Then the core properties which are necessary and sufficient for the convergence of the method are, for a family of GDs, the coercivity, the GD-consistency and the limit-conformity properties, as defined in the next section. More generally, these three core properties are sufficient to prove the convergence of the GDM for linear problems and for some nonlinear problems like the -Laplace problem. For nonlinear problems such as nonlinear diffusion, degenerate parabolic problems..., we add in the next section two other core properties which may be required.

The core properties allowing for the convergence of a GDM

Let  be a family of GDs, defined as above (generally associated with a sequence of regular meshes whose size tends to 0).

Coercivity 
The sequence  (defined by ) remains bounded.

GD-consistency 
For all ,  (defined by ).

Limit-conformity 
For all ,  (defined by ).
This property implies the coercivity property.

Compactness (needed for some nonlinear problems)

Piecewise constant reconstruction  (needed for some nonlinear problems)
Let   be a gradient discretisation as defined above.

Some non-linear problems with complete convergence proofs of the GDM

We review some problems for which the GDM can be proved to converge when the above core properties are satisfied.

Nonlinear stationary diffusion problems 

In this case, the GDM converges under the coercivity, GD-consistency, limit-conformity and compactness properties.

p-Laplace problem for p > 1

Linear and nonlinear heat equation 

In this case, the GDM converges under the coercivity, GD-consistency (adapted to space-time problems), limit-conformity and compactness (for the nonlinear case) properties.

Degenerate parabolic problems 

Note that, for this problem, the piecewise constant reconstruction property is needed, in addition to the coercivity, GD-consistency (adapted to space-time problems), limit-conformity and compactness properties.

Review of some numerical methods which are GDM

All the methods below satisfy the first four core properties of GDM (coercivity, GD-consistency, limit-conformity, compactness), and in some cases the fifth one (piecewise constant reconstruction).

Galerkin methods and conforming finite element methods

Let  be spanned by the finite basis .

In this case,  is the constant involved in the continuous Poincaré inequality, and, for all ,  (defined by ).

Using mass lumping allows to get the piecewise constant reconstruction property.

Nonconforming finite element 

Mixed finite element 

It suffices to use the discrete relations between these approximations to define a GDM. Using the low degree Raviart–Thomas basis functions allows to get the piecewise constant reconstruction property.

Discontinuous Galerkin method 

The Discontinuous Galerkin method consists in approximating problems by a piecewise polynomial function, without requirements on the jumps from an element to the other. It is plugged in the GDM framework by including in the discrete gradient a jump term, acting as the regularization of the gradient in the distribution sense.

Mimetic finite difference method and nodal mimetic finite difference method 

This family of methods is introduced by [Brezzi et al] and completed in [Lipnikov et al]. It allows the approximation of elliptic problems using a large class of polyhedral meshes. The proof that it enters the GDM framework is done in [Droniou et al].

See also
Finite element method

References

External links 
 The Gradient Discretisation Method by Jérôme Droniou, Robert Eymard, Thierry Gallouët, Cindy Guichard and Raphaèle Herbin

Numerical differential equations
Numerical analysis